Viáfara is a surname. Notable people with the surname include:

 Henry Viáfara (born 1953), Colombian footballer
 Jhon Viáfara (born 1978), Colombian footballer
 Julián Viáfara (born 1978), Colombian footballer